Sonde (French for probe) may refer to:

Electronic probes
CTD (instrument), a type of water quality sensor
Ionosonde, a radar for examining the ionosphere
Radiosonde, a piece of equipment used on weather balloons
Rocketsonde, a sounding rocket for atmospheric observations
Dropsonde, a weather reconnaissance device

Places
Sonde, Togo, a town in Togo
Sonde, Taungtha, a place in Taungtha Township, Burma (Myanmar)
Sonde, Uganda, a settlement in Mukono District, Uganda

Other uses
Sonde (music group), a music ensemble based in Montreal
Sonde language, either of two Bantu languages of the Democratic Republic of the Congo

See also

 Sondes (surname)
 
Sonda (disambiguation)
Sounding (disambiguation)
Probe (disambiguation)